Vilcabamba (in Hispanicized spelling), Willkapampa (Aymara and Quechua) is often called the Lost City of the Incas. Vilcabamba means "sacred plain" in Quechua. The modern name for the Inca ruins of Vilcabamba is Espiritu Pampa (Plain of the Spirits). Vilcabamba is located in Echarate District of La Convención Province in the Cuzco Region of Peru.

Vilcabamba was the capital of the Neo-Inca State from 1539 to 1572. The Neo-Inca State was the last refuge of the Inca Empire until it fell to the Spaniards and their indigenous allies in 1572, signaling the end of Inca resistance to Spanish rule. Subsequently, Vilcabamba was abandoned and its location forgotten. In 1911 explorer Hiram Bingham mistakenly identified the abandoned ruin of Machu Picchu as Vilcabamba, but he also visited a ruin called Espiritu Pampa by local Peruvians. In 1964, Gene Savoy identified Espiritu Pampa as the fabled Vilcabamba, a designation widely accepted by archaeologists and historians.

Vilcabamba or Espiritu Pampa is located near the Chontabamba River, a tributary of the Urubamba River.

In 2010, items belonging to the Wari culture and radiocarbon dated to about 700 CE were found at Espiritu Pampa.  This discovery indicated that the site was occupied long before it became the Inca capital in 1539. As of 2013, archaeological investigations of the site were incomplete and the ruins of Espiritu Pampa were inaccessible by vehicle.

History 
La Convención province in which Vilcabamba is located is extremely rugged, occupying the north-eastern slopes of the Andes and sloping down to the Amazon Basin.  The terrain includes snow-covered mountains, forest, lowland jungle, and rivers running through deep canyons.  Access and transportation within the area was difficult and would hinder Spanish efforts to destroy the last outposts of the Inca Empire.

The Incas had occupied the Vilcabamba region since about 1450 CE, establishing major centers at Machu Picchu, Choquequirao, Vitcos, and Vilcabamba. Thus, the Incas were familiar with the region when Inca emperor, Manco Inca Yupanqui, won the Battle of Ollantaytambo against the Spanish and their Indian allies in January 1537.  Despite the victory Manco was under intense pressure from the Spanish.  He decided that Ollantaytambo was too close to Cusco, controlled by the Spanish, so he withdrew westward to the Inca center of Vitcos. Almagro sent his lieutenant Rodrigo Orgóñez in pursuit with 300 Spaniards and numerous Indian allies. In July 1537, Orgoñez occupied and sacked Vitcos taking many prisoners, but Manco escaped.

Manco Inca survived another Spain raid in 1539 by Gonzalo Pizarro, 300 Spanish soldiers, and Indian allies. Several Spaniards and Indians were killed, but Manco again escaped. Pizarro stayed in the region for more than two months searching for Manco unsuccessfully, but capturing Manco's principal wife Cura Ocllo. The Spaniards wrote of the region that "great resources are needed to undertake a penetration of that land. It can be done only with very heavy expenditure." The Spanish would not attempt another major military expedition into Vilcabamba until 1572. As the two Spanish raids demonstrated, Vitcos was accessible to the Spanish and Manco developed Vilcabamba as a more remote refuge.

In the years following the Spanish raids, the Incas and the Spaniards maintained uneasy diplomatic relations with visits back and forth between Vilcabamba and Cuzco, the Spanish capital. The murder of a Spanish envoy by the Incas persuaded Viceroy of Peru Francisco de Toledo to conquer the Vilcabamba region and end Inca rule. On June 24, 1572, a Spanish army, led by veteran conquistador Martin Hurtado de Arbieto, made a final advance on the Incas' remote jungle capital. "At 10 o'clock," wrote Hurtado in his account of the campaign, "they marched into the city of Vilcabamba, all on foot, for it is the most wild and rugged country, in no way suitable for horses." What they discovered was a city built "for about a thousand fighting Indians, besides many other women, children, and old people" filled with "four hundred houses."

After the fall of Vilcabamba, the Spanish pursued and captured Túpac Amaru, the last Inca monarch, and beheaded him in Cusco on September 24, 1572.

Spanish Vilcabamba 
It is located on the Pampaconas River, a tributary of the Vilcabamba River, which is a tributary of the Urubamba River. 
Hurtado was a brutal administrator, offering encomiendas to Spanish soldiers and making the local Indians virtual slaves.  Many of them died, or abandoned their homes and fled elsewhere. Silver deposits were discovered nearby and the town enjoyed a brief boom, although the production of the mines was meager and by the early 17th century Vilcabamba the New and the Vilcabama region was no longer of much interest to the Spanish. Hiram Bingham visited the town in 1911, noting that, "Instead of Inca walls or ruins, Vilcabamba has three score solidly built Spanish houses...due to the prosperity of gold diggers, who came to work the quartz mines which were made accessible after the death of Tupac Amaru."  Catholic clerics had built a church and a monastery in the town.

The lost city

The location of the Incan Vilcabamba was forgotten during the 17th century by the few remaining inhabitants of the region. Later historians and explorers identified Choquequirao as Vilcabamba. In 1909, Peruvian historian, Carlos A. Romero, debunked the claim that Choquequirao was Incan Vilcabamba based on his studies of writings by Spanish chroniclers of the 16th century. Romero identified the village of Puquiura as the site of Incan Vilcabamba.

In 1911, Hiram Bingham was on the expedition which resulted in him bringing to a wider world attention the Incan ruin of Machu Picchu. Romero pointed him toward Puquiura as the site of Vilcabamba, and Bingham discovered there the ruins of Rosaspata. He correctly identified Rosaspata as the Incan Vitcos rather than Incan Vilcabamba. Drawn by rumors of another lost Inca ruin in the lowland forest, Bingham ignored tales of a hostile plantation owner and dangerous native peoples and proceeded onward. After a difficult three days of foot travel, he found the plantation. Its owner and the Asháninka or Campa indigenous peoples working there were friendly and helpful. They assisted him in cutting a trail through the jungle and two days later he found Inca ruins at a place called Espiritu Pampa. But Bingham was running out of supplies and only spent a short time at Espiritu Pampa. Based on his brief observations, Bingham concluded that Machu Picchu was the Incan Vilcabamba. That opinion went largely unchallenged for 50 years. 

In 1964, Peruvian explorer Antonio Santander Caselli visited Espiritu Pampa and later claimed the discovery that Espiritu Pampa was the Incan Villabamba. In the same month, American explorer Gene Savoy reached Espiritu Pampa. He discovered that Bingham had only seen a minor part of the ruin at Eremboni Pampa and that the main ruin of Espiritu Pampa was  distant. Savoy found 50 or 60 houses and 300 houses at Espiritu Pampa. Savoy concluded that Espiritu Pampa was Vilcabamba, contradicting Bingham.  Savoy's 1970 book Antisuyo brought the site to even wider attention.

Researcher and author John Hemming also concluded the Espiritu Pampa was Incan Vilcabamba in his 1970 book The Conquest of the Incas. He cited contemporary Spanish and Inca accounts of Vilcabamba as evidence. Titu Cusi Yupanqui said that Vilcambamba had a "warm climate," unlike Vitcos which was in "a cold district." Moreover, both the conqueror of Vilcabamba, Hurtado de Abierto, and chronicler Martín de Murúa cited the tropical crops--coca, cotton, and sugar cane—grown near Vilcabamba and that the city lay in a "hot country" unlike most Inca cities. The Inca preferred to live in the high, cool climate of the Andes. Hurtado also described Vilcabamba as being in a valley with "pastures for cattle," unlike Machu Picchu which is on a steep ridge. Finally, Hemming cited Spanish sources indicating that Vilcabamba was northeast of Vitcos—unlike Machu Picchu which is west of Vitcos. Thus, Bingham's claim that Macchu Picchu was Incan Villabamba and other claims that Vitcos was Vilcabamba were discredited.

In 1976, Professor Edmundo Guillén and Polish explorers Tony Halik and Elżbieta Dzikowska continued to explore the ruins at Espiritu Pampa. Before the expedition, Guillen visited a museum in Seville where he discovered letters from Spaniards, in which they described the progress of the invasion and what they found in Vilcabamba. Comparison between the letters' contents and the ruins provided additional proof of Espiritu Pampa as the location of Vilcabamba.

In 1981, the party of American explorer Gregory Deyermenjian reached and photographed parts of the site, soon thereafter generating a popular article concerning the site and its history.

Later extensive archeological work by Vincent Lee, and especially his exhaustive study, his 2000 book Forgotten Vilcabamba, gave further and even more precise confirmation that has made Espíritu Pampa the definitively accepted site of the historical Vilcabamba.

On 16 June 2006, a museum in Cuzco unveiled a plaque that commemorates the thirtieth anniversary of the 1976 Vilcabamba findings.

In popular culture 
The lost city of Vilcabamba features in the educational computer game series The Amazon Trail, the Tomb Raider videogame and its remake Tomb Raider: Anniversary, and the books Evil Star and Necropolis by British thriller author Anthony Horowitz. Vilcabamba is also a playable place in the PlayStation 2 RPG Shadow Hearts: From the New World.

The second episode of Michael Wood's 2000 documentary series Conquistadors  visits the site of Vilcabamba while telling the story of the fall of the Inca and retreat of Manco and his followers to the remote region as the last surviving remnant of the empire.

The city was the location of British writer Colin Thubron's 2002 novel, To the Last City, which was short-listed for the Man Booker Prize, and tells the story of a group of people who set off to explore the ruins of the Inca city in what has been described as a "Heart of Darkness narrative" in a "Marquezian setting".

The science fiction story "Vilcabamba" (2010) by Harry Turtledove is a self-referential allegory of Vilcabamba as an alien invasion story set in the 22nd century.

An episode of the TV Series In Search of... (1976-1982) titled "Inca Treasures", highlights the expedition taken by professor Edmundo Guillén to explore the ruins of Vilcabamba.

Gallery

See also 
List of archaeological sites in Peru
 Ñusta Hisp'ana
 Spanish conquest of Peru
 Túpac Amaru

References

Sources 
Deyermenjian, Gregory. (1985). "Vilcabamba Revisited" in South American Explorer, No. 12.

Santander Casselli, Antonio (no date) "Vilcabamba" in Andanzas de un Soñador.

Further reading
 
 Laurence Blair (2018). Peru’s last Incan city reveals its secrets: ‘It’s genuinely a marvel’. Espíritu Pampa: TheGuardian.com

16th-century establishments in the Inca civilization
16th-century disestablishments in the Inca civilization
1572 establishments in the Spanish Empire
1892 archaeological discoveries
Former populated places in Peru
History of Peru
Inca
Lost cities and towns
Populated places established in 1539
Archaeological sites in Peru